Shahrinav District ( Nohiyai Shahrinav; Russian spelling; Shakhrinav) is a district in Tajikistan, one of the Districts of Republican Subordination. It lies between Tajikistan's capital Dushanbe and Uzbekistan. The Shahrinav District borders on the city of Tursunzoda in the west, the city of Hisor in the east, and Rudaki District in the south. It is delimited by the Gissar Range in the north and is part of the fertile Gissar Valley. Its capital is Shahrinav, a village 30 km west of Dushanbe. The population of the district is 123,000 (January 2020 estimate).

Administrative divisions
They are as follows:

References

Districts of Tajikistan